Kaushambi is an elevated metro station located on the branch line of the Blue Line of the Delhi Metro in Delhi. Built as part of a 2.57 km extension from Anand Vihar station, it was originally expected to open in March 2011. After multiple delays, the station finally opened on 14 July 2011, with 200 parking spaces to cater to commuters in the vicinity.

Station Layout

Facilities

ATM
RBL Bank
HDFC Bank
Punjab National Bank

F&B
An F&B counter operated by IRCTC is situated in the station premises.

Restaurants
The station is considered among the commercially well utilized metro stations. With the ground area below the station strategically used by popular MNC food outlets and fine dining restaurants such as Domino's, McDonald's, Mr. Brown Bakery, Sree Rathnam & Maini's Green Leaf, perks up a refreshing delight for the travelers and food lovers alike.

See also
List of Delhi Metro stations
Transport in Delhi
Delhi Metro Rail Corporation
Delhi Suburban Railway
List of rapid transit systems in India

References

External links

 Delhi Metro Rail Corporation Ltd. (Official site) 
 Delhi Metro Annual Reports
 
 UrbanRail.Net – descriptions of all metro systems in the world, each with a schematic map showing all stations.

Delhi Metro stations
Railway stations opened in 2011
Railway stations in Ghaziabad district, India